The Monmouth Cup was an American Thoroughbred horse race run annually in July at the Monmouth Park Association's racetrack in Long Branch, New Jersey. First run as part of the racetrack's inaugural season in 1870, the Monmouth Cup was open to horses aged three and older. It was created as a long distance race but the long distance soon declined in popularity and the race was subsequently run at various shorter distances:
  miles : (1870–1876)
  miles : (1878–1882)
  miles : (1887–1890, 1892)
  miles : (1891) at Jerome Park Racetrack

In 1891, the races at Long Branch had to be shifted to racetracks in New York when government legislation attempted to inhibit parimutuel wagering. The race meetings were split between the Jerome Park Racetrack  in Fordham, Bronx and the nearby Morris Park Racecourse at Westchester Village. The Monmouth Park Racing Association closed and the land was sold after its operating license was revoked in 1893 and government legislation was enacted that banned parimutuel wagering.

The final running in 1892 was won in a walkover by Longstreet.

The race should not be confused with the race of the same name, which was originally the Meadowlands Cup but moved to Monmouth Park in 2010.

Winners

1892 – Longstreet
1891 – Riley
1890 – Salvator
1889 – Firenze
1888 – Firenze
1887 – Troubadour
1882 – Eole
1881 – Monitor
1880 – Report
1879 – Bramble
1878 – Parole
1877 – no race
1876 – Tom Ochiltree
1875 – Aaron Pennington
1874 – Tom Bowling
1873 – Wanderer
1872 – Longfellow
1871 – Longfellow 
1870 – Helmbold

References

External links
 July 12, 1889 New york Times article on  Firenze's second straight win in the Monmouth Cup

Open long distance horse races
Discontinued horse races
Monmouth Park Racetrack
Horse races in New Jersey
1870 establishments in New Jersey
1892 disestablishments in New Jersey
Recurring sporting events established in 1870
Recurring events disestablished in 1892